William D. Gorman (March 31, 1920 – February 4, 2009) was an American politician. He served as a Republican member for the 42nd district of the Florida House of Representatives. He also served as a member for the 15th district of the Florida Senate.

Life and career 
Gorman was born in Baltimore. He went to high school in Swarthmore, Pennsylvania, and attended Lehigh University.

In 1967, Gorman was elected as the first representative for the newly-established 42nd district of the Florida House of Representatives. He served until 1976, when he was succeeded by Toni Jennings. In the same year, he was elected to represent the 15th district of the Florida Senate, serving until 1980.

Gorman died in February 2009, at the age of 88.

References 

1920 births
2009 deaths
Republican Party Florida state senators
Republican Party members of the Florida House of Representatives
20th-century American politicians
Lehigh University alumni
Politicians from Baltimore